The 1977 Mr. Olympia contest was an IFBB professional bodybuilding competition held in September, 1977 at Veterans Memorial Auditorium in Columbus, Ohio.

Results
The total prize money awarded was $13,000.

Over 200lbs

Under 200lbs

Overall winner

Notable events
Frank Zane won his first Mr. Olympia title

References

External links 
 Mr. Olympia

 1977
1977 in American sports
1977 in bodybuilding